The Senoic languages (also called Sakai) are a group of Aslian languages spoken by about 33,000 people in the main range of the Malay peninsula. Languages in the group are: Semai and Temiar (the main languages), Lanoh, Sabüm, and  Semnam.

References

External links 
 http://projekt.ht.lu.se/rwaai RWAAI (Repository and Workspace for Austroasiatic Intangible Heritage)
 http://hdl.handle.net/10050/00-0000-0000-0003-66EF-E@view Central Aslian languages in RWAAI Digital Archive

Languages of Malaysia
Malay Peninsula
Peninsular Malaysia